The Lincoln Estate–Elm Park Historic District is an expansive residential area in northwestern Worcester, Massachusetts.  It is centered on Cedar and William Streets, and includes properties on adjacent streets.  The area was developed beginning in the late 1830s by former Governor of Massachusetts Levi Lincoln, Jr., a Worcester native who had inherited land in the area.  The district was divided and developed by Lincoln until his death, and then by his heirs, and became a popular location for homes of Worcester's wealthy and elite, many of which were designed by architects.

The district was listed on the National Register of Historic Places in 1980.

See also
National Register of Historic Places listings in northwestern Worcester, Massachusetts
National Register of Historic Places listings in Worcester County, Massachusetts
Neighborhoods of Worcester, Massachusetts

References

Second Empire architecture in Massachusetts
Queen Anne architecture in Massachusetts
Shingle Style architecture in Massachusetts
Historic districts in Worcester, Massachusetts
National Register of Historic Places in Worcester, Massachusetts
Neighborhoods in Worcester, Massachusetts
Historic districts on the National Register of Historic Places in Massachusetts